The Permanent Secretary to the Scottish Government is the most senior civil servant in Scotland who leads more than 7000 staff within the Scottish Government and has oversight of around 125 agencies. The permanent secretary supports the Scottish Government in developing, implementing and communicating its policy agenda. The permanent secretary is the chief official policy adviser to the First Minister of Scotland and acts as secretary during cabinet meetings. The permanent secretary is also responsible for ensuring that the government's money and resources are used effectively and properly. The role is currently occupied by John-Paul Marks, who was appointed in January 2022 by First Minister Nicola Sturgeon, with the agreement of the Cabinet Secretary, Simon Case.

History
The role of permanent secretary originally headed the Office of the Permanent Secretary, which was a civil service department of the Scottish Government (at the time styled as the Scottish Executive). The departments that made up the Scottish Executive were abolished in May 2007. Functions are now delivered by over 30 separate directorates.

List of permanent secretaries
Muir Russell (May 1998–July 2003)
John Elvidge (July 2003–June 2010)
Peter Housden (June 2010–June 2015)
Leslie Evans (June 2015–December 2021)
John-Paul Marks (January 2022–present)

See also
Civil service
Scottish Government
Directorates of the Scottish Government

References

External links
Scottish Government official site of the Scottish Government

Scottish Government
Civil Service (United Kingdom)